Tiganophytaceae is a family in the plant order Brassicales, consisting of the sole monotypic genus, Tiganophyton, represented by T. karasense. The family is endemic to Namibia, occurring in the arid Karas Region of southern Namibia.

References

Brassicales
Brassicales families
Monogeneric plant families